The Radeon HD 7000 series, codenamed "Southern Islands", is a family of GPUs developed by AMD, and manufactured on TSMC's 28 nm process. The primary competitor of Southern Islands, Nvidia's GeForce 600 Series (also manufactured at TSMC), also shipped during Q1 2012, largely due to the immaturity of the 28 nm process.

Architecture
Graphics Core Next was introduced with the Radeon HD 7000 Series.
A GPU implementing Graphics Core Next is found on the Radeon HD 7730 and above branded discrete GPUs.
A GPU implementing TeraScale (microarchitecture) version "Evergreen (VLIW5)" is found on Radeon HD 7670 and below branded discrete GPUs.
A GPU implementing TeraScale (microarchitecture) version "Northern Islands (VLIW4)" is found on APUs whose GPUs are branded with the Radeon HD 7000 series.
OpenGL 4.x compliance requires supporting FP64 shaders. These are implemented by emulation on some TeraScale (microarchitecture) GPUs.
 Vulkan 1.0 requires GCN-Architecture. Vulkan 1.1 requires actual 2nd Gen. of GCN or higher (here only HD 7790). On newer drivers Vulkan 1.1 on Windows and Linux is supported on all GCN-architecture based GPUs.

Multi-monitor support

The AMD Eyefinity-branded on-die display controllers were introduced in September 2009 in the Radeon HD 5000 Series and have been present in all products since.

Video acceleration
Both Unified Video Decoder (UVD) and Video Coding Engine (VCE) are present on the dies of all products and supported by AMD Catalyst and by the free and open-source graphics device driver#ATI/AMD.

OpenCL (API) 

OpenCL accelerates many scientific Software Packages against CPU up to factor 10 or 100 and more.
Open CL 1.0 to 1.2 are supported for all Chips with Terascale and GCN Architecture. OpenCL 2.0 is supported with GCN 2nd Gen. or 1.2 and higher)   For OpenCL 2.1 and 2.2 only Driver Updates are necessary with OpenCL 2.0 conformant Cards.

Vulkan (API) 

Vulkan 1.1 is supported for all with GCN Architecture with recent drivers on Linux and Windows.
Vulkan 1.2 is available for GCN 2nd Gen or higher with Windows Adrenalin 20.1(and newer) and Linux Mesa 20.0(and newer).

Desktop products

The 28 nm product line is divided in three dies (Tahiti, Pitcairn, and Cape Verde), each one highly increasing shader units (32, 20 and 10 respectively). While this gives a high increase in single-precision floating point, there is however a significant departure in double-precision compute power. Tahiti has a maximum ¼ double precision throughput relative to its single precision throughput, while the other two smaller consumer dies can only achieve a 1/16 ratio. While each bigger die has two additional memory controllers widening its bus by 128 bits, Pitcairn however has the same front-end dual tesselator units as Tahiti giving it similar performance to its larger brethren in DX11 tessellation benchmarks.

Radeon HD 7900
Codenamed Tahiti, the Radeon HD 7900 series was announced on December 22, 2011. Products include the Radeon 7970 GHz Edition, Radeon HD 7970 and Radeon HD 7950. The Radeon HD 7970 features 2048 usable stream cores, whereas the Radeon HD 7950 has 1792 usable stream cores, as 256 out of the 2048 cores are disabled during product binning which detects defective areas of a chip. The cards are the first products to take advantage of AMD's new "Graphics Core Next" compute architecture. Both cards are equipped with 3 GB GDDR5 memory and manufactured on TSMC's 28 nm process. The Tahiti GPU is also used in the Radeon HD 7870 XT, released November 19, 2012. In this case one quarter of the stream processors are disabled, giving 1536 usable cores. Additionally, the memory interface  is downgraded from 384-bit to 256-bit, along with a memory size reduction from 3 GB to 2 GB.

Radeon HD 7800
Codenamed Pitcairn, the Radeon HD 7800 series was formally unveiled on March 5, 2012, with retail availability from March 19, 2012. Products include the Radeon HD 7870 and Radeon HD 7850. The Radeon HD 7870 features 1280 usable stream cores, whereas the Radeon HD 7850 has 1024 usable stream cores. Both cards are equipped with 2GB GDDR5 memory (some 7850s offer 1GB) and manufactured on TSMC's 28 nm process.

Radeon HD 7700
Codenamed Cape Verde, the Radeon HD 7700 series was released on February 15, 2012. Products include the Radeon HD 7770 GHz Edition and Radeon HD 7750. The Radeon HD 7770 GHz Edition features 640 stream cores based on the GCN architecture, whereas the Radeon HD 7750 has only 512 usable stream cores. Both cards are equipped with 1 GB GDDR5 memory and manufactured in 28 nm. On March 22, 2013, another card, Radeon HD 7790, was introduced in this series. This card is based on the Bonaire architecture, which features 896 stream cores using 2nd Generation GCN technology, an incremental update. In May 2013, AMD launched the Radeon HD 7730, based on the Cape Verde LE graphics processor. It features a 128-bit memory bus, 384 stream cores, 8 ROPs, and a core clock speed of up to 800 MHz. The HD 7730 came with GDDR5 and DDR3 variants, running on memory clock speeds of 1125 MHz and 900 MHz, respectively. Load power usage was lowered by 14.5% (47W) compared to the Radeon HD 7750 (55W).

Chipset table

Desktop products 

 HD 7790 model is designed more like the 7800–7900 models rather than the 7700 featuring 2x primitive rate instead of 1x which is found in the other 7700 cards.
 Bonaire XT is the only card in the 7000 series to support True Audio.

IGP (HD 7xxx) 
 All models feature the UNB/MC Bus interface
 All models do not feature double-precision FP
 All models feature angle independent anisotropic filtering, UVD3.2, and Eyefinity capabilities, with up to four outputs.
 All models are based on the TeraScale 3 (VLIW4) used in the Radeon HD 69xx Series (Cayman) GPUs.

Mobile products

Integrated (IGP) products

Radeon Feature Matrix

Graphics device drivers

AMD's proprietary graphics device driver "Catalyst" 

AMD Catalyst is being developed for Microsoft Windows and Linux. As of July 2014, other operating systems are not officially supported. This may be different for the AMD FirePro brand, which is based on identical hardware but features OpenGL-certified graphics device drivers.

AMD Catalyst supports all features advertised for the Radeon brand.

Free and open-source graphics device driver "Radeon" 

The free and open-source drivers are primarily developed on Linux and for Linux, but have been ported to other operating systems as well. Each driver is composed out of five parts:

 Linux kernel component DRM
 Linux kernel component KMS driver: basically the device driver for the display controller
 user-space component libDRM
 user-space component in Mesa 3D;
 a special and distinct 2D graphics device driver for X.Org Server, which if finally about to be replaced by Glamor

The free and open-source "Radeon" graphics driver supports most of the features implemented into the Radeon line of GPUs.

The free and open-source "Radeon" graphics device drivers are not reverse engineered, but based on documentation released by AMD.

See also 
 AMD FirePro
 AMD FireMV
 AMD FireStream
 List of AMD graphics processing units

Notes

References

External links
 
 techPowerUp! GPU Database

AMD graphics cards
Computer-related introductions in 2012
Graphics processing units